Optical coherence tomography (OCT) is an imaging technique that uses low-coherence light to capture micrometer-resolution, two- and three-dimensional images from within optical scattering media (e.g., biological tissue). It is used for medical imaging and industrial nondestructive testing (NDT). Optical coherence tomography is based on low-coherence interferometry, typically employing near-infrared light. The use of relatively long wavelength light allows it to penetrate into the scattering medium. Confocal microscopy, another optical technique, typically penetrates less deeply into the sample but with higher resolution.

Depending on the properties of the light source (superluminescent diodes, ultrashort pulsed lasers, and supercontinuum lasers have been employed), optical coherence tomography has achieved sub-micrometer resolution (with very wide-spectrum sources emitting over a ~100 nm wavelength range).

Optical coherence tomography is one of a class of optical tomographic techniques. Commercially available optical coherence tomography systems are employed in diverse applications, including art conservation and diagnostic medicine, notably in ophthalmology and optometry where it can be used to obtain detailed images from within the retina. Recently, it has also begun to be used in interventional cardiology to help diagnose coronary artery disease, and in dermatology to improve diagnosis. A relatively recent implementation of optical coherence tomography, frequency-domain optical coherence tomography, provides advantages in the signal-to-noise ratio provided, thus permitting faster signal acquisition. OCT is not the same as Optical coherence microscopy (OCM), which "is a microscopic incarnation of optical coherence tomography (OCT)" that can be used for 3D imaging reconstruction through intrinsic contrasting of back-scattered (coherent) light.

Introduction

Starting from Adolf Fercher and colleagues’ work on low-, partial coherence or white-light interferometry for in vivo ocular eye measurements in Vienna in the 1980s, imaging of biological tissue, especially of the human eye, was investigated in parallel by multiple groups worldwide. A first two-dimensional in vivo depiction of a human eye fundus along a horizontal meridian based on white light interferometric depth scans was presented at the ICO-15 SAT conference in 1990. Further developed in 1990 by Naohiro Tanno, then a professor at Yamagata University it was referred to as heterodyne reflectance tomography, and in particular since 1991 by Huang et al., in Prof. James Fujimoto laboratory at Massachusetts Institute of Technology, who successfully coined the term “optical coherence tomography”. Since then, OCT with micrometer resolution and cross-sectional imaging capabilities has become a prominent biomedical tissue-imaging technique that continuously picked up new technical capabilities starting from early electronic signal detection, via utilisation of broadband lasers and linear pixel arrays to ultrafast tuneable lasers to expand its performance and sensitivity envelope.

It is particularly suited to ophthalmic applications and other tissue imaging requiring micrometer resolution and millimeter penetration depth. First in vivo OCT images – displaying retinal structures – were published in 1993 and first endoscopic images in 1997. OCT has also been used for various art conservation projects, where it is used to analyze different layers in a painting. OCT has interesting advantages over other medical imaging systems. Medical ultrasonography, magnetic resonance imaging (MRI), confocal microscopy, and OCT are differently suited to morphological tissue imaging: while the first two have whole body but low resolution imaging capability (typically a fraction of a millimeter), the third one can provide images with resolutions well below 1 micrometer (i.e. sub-cellular), between 0 and 100 micrometers in depth, and the fourth can probe as deep as 500 micrometers, but with a lower (i.e. architectural) resolution (around 10 micrometers in lateral and a few micrometers in depth in ophthalmology, for instance, and 20 micrometers in lateral in endoscopy).

OCT is based on low-coherence interferometry. In conventional interferometry with long coherence length (i.e., laser interferometry), interference of light occurs over a distance of meters. In OCT, this interference is shortened to a distance of micrometers, owing to the use of broad-bandwidth light sources (i.e., sources that emit light over a broad range of frequencies). Light with broad bandwidths can be generated by using superluminescent diodes or lasers with extremely short pulses (femtosecond lasers). White light is an example of a broadband source with lower power.

Light in an OCT system is broken into two arms – a sample arm (containing the item of interest) and a reference arm (usually a mirror). The combination of reflected light from the sample arm and reference light from the reference arm gives rise to an interference pattern, but only if light from both arms have traveled the "same" optical distance ("same" meaning a difference of less than a coherence length). By scanning the mirror in the reference arm, a reflectivity profile of the sample can be obtained (this is time domain OCT). Areas of the sample that reflect back a lot of light will create greater interference than areas that don't. Any light that is outside the short coherence length will not interfere. This reflectivity profile, called an A-scan, contains information about the spatial dimensions and location of structures within the item of interest. A cross-sectional tomogram (B-scan) may be achieved by laterally combining a series of these axial depth scans (A-scan). A face imaging at an acquired depth is possible depending on the imaging engine used.

Layperson's explanation

Optical coherence tomography (OCT) is a technique for obtaining sub-surface images of translucent or opaque materials at a resolution equivalent to a low-power microscope. It is effectively ‘optical ultrasound’, imaging reflections from within tissue to provide cross-sectional images.

OCT has attracted interest among the medical community because it provides tissue morphology imagery at much higher resolution (less than 10 μm axially and less than 20 μm laterally ) than other imaging modalities such as MRI or ultrasound.

The key benefits of OCT are:
 Live sub-surface images at near-microscopic resolution
 Instant, direct imaging of tissue morphology
 No preparation of the sample or subject, no contact
 No ionizing radiation

OCT delivers high resolution because it is based on light, rather than sound or radio frequency. An optical beam is directed at the tissue, and a small portion of this light that reflects from sub-surface features is collected. Note that most light is not reflected but, rather, scatters off at large angles. In conventional imaging, this diffusely scattered light contributes background that obscures an image. However, in OCT, a technique called interferometry is used to record the optical path length of received photons allowing rejection of most photons that scatter multiple times before detection. Thus OCT can build up clear 3D images of thick samples by rejecting background signal while collecting light directly reflected from surfaces of interest.

Within the range of noninvasive three-dimensional imaging techniques that have been introduced to the medical research community, OCT as an echo technique is similar to ultrasound imaging. Other medical imaging techniques such as computerized axial tomography, magnetic resonance imaging, or positron emission tomography do not use the echo-location principle.

The technique is limited to imaging 1 to 2 mm below the surface in biological tissue, because at greater depths the proportion of light that escapes without scattering is too small to be detected. No special preparation of a biological specimen is required, and images can be obtained ‘non-contact’ or through a transparent window or membrane. It is also important to note that the laser output from the instruments used is loweye-safe near-infrared or visible-lightand no damage to the sample is therefore likely.

Theory
The principle of OCT is white light, or low coherence, interferometry. The optical setup typically consists of an interferometer (Fig. 1, typically Michelson type) with a low coherence, broad bandwidth light source. Light is split into and recombined from reference and sample arms, respectively.

Time domain

In time domain OCT the path length of the reference arm is varied in time (the reference mirror is translated longitudinally). A property of low coherence interferometry is that interference, i.e. the series of dark and bright fringes, is only achieved when the path difference lies within the coherence length of the light source. This interference is called autocorrelation in a symmetric interferometer (both arms have the same reflectivity), or cross-correlation in the common case. The envelope of this modulation changes as path length difference is varied, where the peak of the envelope corresponds to path length matching.

The interference of two partially coherent light beams can be expressed in terms of the source intensity, as

Due to the coherence gating effect of OCT the complex degree of coherence is represented as a Gaussian function expressed as

In equation (2), the Gaussian envelope is amplitude modulated by an optical carrier. The peak of this envelope represents the location of the microstructure of the sample under test, with an amplitude dependent on the reflectivity of the surface. The optical carrier is due to the Doppler effect resulting from scanning one arm of the interferometer, and the frequency of this modulation is controlled by the speed of scanning. Therefore, translating one arm of the interferometer has two functions; depth scanning and a Doppler-shifted optical carrier are accomplished by pathlength variation. In OCT, the Doppler-shifted optical carrier has a frequency expressed as

The axial and lateral resolutions of OCT are decoupled from one another; the former being an equivalent to the coherence length of the light source and the latter being a function of the optics. The axial resolution of OCT is defined as
{|
|-
|
|
|-
|
|
|}

Frequency domain
In frequency domain OCT (FD-OCT) the broadband interference is acquired with spectrally separated detectors. Two common approaches are swept-source and spectral-domain OCT. A swept source OCT encodes the optical frequency in time with a spectrally scanning source. A spectral domain OCT uses a dispersive detector, like a grating and a linear detector array, to separate the different wavelengths. Due to the Fourier relation (Wiener–Khinchin theorem between the autocorrelation and the spectral power density) the depth scan can be immediately calculated by a Fourier-transform from the acquired spectra, without movement of the reference arm. This feature improves imaging speed dramatically, while the reduced losses during a single scan improve the signal-to-noise ratio (SNR) proportional to the number of detection elements. The parallel detection at multiple wavelength ranges limits the scanning range, while the full spectral bandwidth sets the axial resolution.

Spatially encoded
Spatially encoded frequency domain OCT (SEFD-OCT, spectral domain or Fourier domain OCT) extracts spectral information by distributing different optical frequencies onto a detector stripe (line-array CCD or CMOS) via a dispersive element (see Fig. 4). Thereby the information of the full depth scan can be acquired within a single exposure. However, the large signal-to-noise advantage of FD-OCT is reduced due to the lower dynamic range of stripe detectors with respect to single photosensitive diodes, resulting in an SNR advantage of ~10 dB at much higher speeds. This is not much of a problem when working at 1300 nm, however, since dynamic range is not a serious problem at this wavelength range.

The drawbacks of this technology are found in a strong fall-off of the SNR, which is proportional to the distance from the zero delay and a sinc-type reduction of the depth-dependent sensitivity because of limited detection linewidth. (One pixel detects a quasi-rectangular portion of an optical frequency range instead of a single frequency, the Fourier transform leads to the sinc(z) behavior). Additionally, the dispersive elements in the spectroscopic detector usually do not distribute the light equally spaced in frequency on the detector, but mostly have an inverse dependence. Therefore, the signal has to be resampled before processing, which can not take care of the difference in local (pixelwise) bandwidth, which results in further reduction of the signal quality. However, the fall-off is not a serious problem with the development of new generation CCD or photodiode array with a larger number of pixels.

Synthetic array heterodyne detection offers another approach to this problem without the need for high dispersion.

Time encoded
Time-encoded frequency domain OCT (TEFD-OCT, or swept-source OCT) tries to combine some of the advantages of standard TD and SEFD-OCT. Here the spectral components are not encoded by spatial separation, but they are encoded in time. The spectrum is either filtered or generated in single successive frequency steps and reconstructed before Fourier transformation. By accommodation of a frequency scanning light source (i.e. frequency scanning laser) the optical setup (see Fig. 3) becomes simpler than SEFD, but the problem of scanning is essentially translated from the TD-OCT reference arm into the TEFD-OCT light source.
Here the advantage lies in the proven high SNR detection technology, while swept laser sources achieve very small instantaneous bandwidths (linewidths) at very high frequencies (20–200 kHz). Drawbacks are the nonlinearities in the wavelength (especially at high scanning frequencies), the broadening of the linewidth at high frequencies and a high sensitivity to movements of the scanning geometry or the sample (below the range of nanometers within successive frequency steps).

Full-field OCT

An imaging approach to temporal OCT was developed by Claude Boccara's team in 1998, with an acquisition of the images without beam scanning. In this technique called full-field OCT (FF-OCT), unlike other OCT techniques that acquire cross-sections of the sample, the images are here "en-face" i.e. like images of classical microscopy: orthogonal to the light beam of illumination.

More precisely, interferometric images are created by a Michelson interferometer where the path length difference is varied by a fast electric component (usually a piezo mirror in the reference arm). These images acquired by a CCD camera are combined in post-treatment (or online) by the phase shift interferometry method, where usually 2 or 4 images per modulation period are acquired, depending on the algorithm used. More recently, approaches that allow rapid single-shot imaging were developed to simultaneously capture multiple phase-shifted images required for reconstruction, using single camera. Single-shot time-domain OCM is limited only by the camera frame rate and available illumination.

The "en-face" tomographic images are thus produced by a wide-field illumination, ensured by the Linnik configuration of the Michelson interferometer where a microscope objective is used in both arms. Furthermore, while the temporal coherence of the source must remain low as in classical OCT (i.e. a broad spectrum), the spatial coherence must also be low to avoid parasitical interferences (i.e. a source with a large size).

Line-field (confocal) OCT
Line-field confocal optical coherence tomography (LC-OCT) is an imaging technique based on the principle of time-domain OCT with line illumination using a broadband laser and line detection using a line-scan camera. LC-OCT produces B-scans in real-time from multiple A-scans acquired in parallel. En face as well as three-dimensional images can also be obtained by scanning the illumination line laterally. The focus is continuously adjusted during the scan of the sample depth, using a high numerical aperture (NA) microscope objective to image with high lateral resolution. By using a supercontinuum laser as a light source, a quasi-isotropic spatial resolution of ~ 1 µm is achieved at a central wavelength of ~ 800 nm. On the other hand, line illumination and detection, combined with the use of a high NA microscope objective, produce a confocal gate that prevents most scattered light that does not contribute to the signal from being detected by the camera. This confocal gate, which is absent in the full-field OCT technique, gives LC-OCT an advantage in terms of detection sensitivity and penetration in highly scattering media such as skin tissues. So far this technique has been used mainly for skin imaging in the fields of dermatology and cosmetology.

Scanning schemes
Focusing the light beam to a point on the surface of the sample under test, and recombining the reflected light with the reference will yield an interferogram with sample information corresponding to a single A-scan (Z axis only). Scanning of the sample can be accomplished by either scanning the light on the sample, or by moving the sample under test. A linear scan will yield a two-dimensional data set corresponding to a cross-sectional image (X-Z axes scan), whereas an area scan achieves a three-dimensional data set corresponding to a volumetric image (X-Y-Z axes scan).

Single point
Systems based on single point, confocal, or flying-spot time domain OCT, must scan the sample in two lateral dimensions and reconstruct a three-dimensional image using depth information obtained by coherence-gating through an axially scanning reference arm (Fig. 2). Two-dimensional lateral scanning has been electromechanically implemented by moving the sample using a translation stage, and using a novel micro-electro-mechanical system scanner.

Parallel
Parallel or full field OCT using a charge-coupled device (CCD) camera has been used in which the sample is full-field illuminated and en face imaged with the CCD, hence eliminating the electromechanical lateral scan. By stepping the reference mirror and recording successive en face images a three-dimensional representation can be reconstructed. Three-dimensional OCT using a CCD camera was demonstrated in a phase-stepped technique, using geometric phase shifting with a Linnik interferometer, utilising a pair of CCDs and heterodyne detection, and in a Linnik interferometer with an oscillating reference mirror and axial translation stage. Central to the CCD approach is the necessity for either very fast CCDs or carrier generation separate to the stepping reference mirror to track the high frequency OCT carrier.

Smart detector array
A two-dimensional smart detector array, fabricated using a 2 µm complementary metal–oxide–semiconductor (CMOS) process, was used to demonstrate full-field TD-OCT. Featuring an uncomplicated optical setup (Fig. 3), each pixel of the 58x58 pixel smart detector array acted as an individual photodiode and included its own hardware demodulation circuitry.

Selected applications
Optical coherence tomography is an established medical imaging technique and is used across several medical specialties including ophthalmology and cardiology, and is widely used in basic science research applications.

Ophthalmology 
Ocular (or ophthalmic) OCT is used heavily by ophthalmologists and optometrists to obtain high-resolution images of the retina and anterior segment. Owing to OCT's capability to show cross-sections of tissue layers with micrometer resolution, OCT provides a straightforward method of assessing cellular organization, photoreceptor integrity, and axonal thickness in glaucoma, macular degeneration, diabetic macular edema, multiple sclerosis and other eye diseases or systemic pathologies which have ocular signs. Additionally, ophthalmologists leverage OCT to assess the vascular health of the retina via a technique called OCT angiography (OCTA). In ophthalmological surgery, especially retinal surgery, an OCT can be mounted on the microscope. Such a system is called an intraoperative OCT (iOCT) and provides support during the surgery with clinical benefits. Polarization-sensitive OCT was recently applied in the human retina to determine optical polarization properties of vessel walls near the optic nerve.

Cardiology and intravascular applications 
In the setting of cardiology,  OCT is used to image coronary arteries in order to visualize vessel wall lumen morphology and microstructure at a resolution 10 times higher than other existing modalities such as intravascular ultrasounds, and x-ray angiography (intracoronary optical coherence tomography). For this type of application, approximately 1 mm in diameter fiber-optics catheters are used to access artery lumen through semi-invasive interventions such as percutaneous coronary interventions.

The first demonstration of endoscopic OCT was reported in 1997, by researchers in James Fujimoto laboratory at Massachusetts Institute of Technology, including Prof. Guillermo James Tearney and Prof. Brett Bouma. The first TD-OCT imaging catheter and system was commercialized by LightLab Imaging, Inc., a company based in Massachusetts in 2006. The first FD-OCT imaging study was reported by the laboratory of Prof. Guillermo J. Tearney and Prof. Brett Bouma based at Massachusetts General Hospital in 2008. Intravascular FD-OCT was first introduced in the market in 2009 by LightLab Imaging, Inc. and Terumo Corporation launched a second solution for coronary artery imaging in 2012. The higher imaging speed of FD-OCT enabled the widespread adoption of this imaging technology for coronary artery imaging. It is estimated that over 100,000 FD-OCT coronary imaging cases are performed yearly, and that the market is increasing by approximately 20% every year.

Intravascular OCT has been investigated for use in neurovascular applications, too, including imaging for guiding endovascular treatment of ischemic stroke and brain aneurysms. Clinical use has been limited to proximal intracranial anatomy of patient with limited tortuosity, showing the potential of OCT for the imaging of neurovascular disease. An intravascular OCT imaging catheter design tailored for use in tortuous neurovascular anatomy has been proposed in 2020.

Further developments of intravascular OCT included the combination with other optical imaging modalities (multi-modality imaging). OCT has been combined with fluorescence molecular imaging to enhance its capability to detect molecular/functional and tissue morphological information simultaneously. In a similar way, combination with near-infrared spectroscopy has been also demonstrated.

Oncology 
Endoscopic OCT has been applied to the detection and diagnosis of cancer and precancerous lesions, such as Barrett's esophagus and esophageal dysplasia.

Dermatology 
The first use of OCT in dermatology dates back to 1997. Since then, OCT has been applied to the diagnosis of various skin lesions including carcinomas. However, the diagnosis of melanoma using conventional OCT is difficult, especially due to insufficient imaging resolution. Emerging high-resolution OCT techniques such as LC-OCT have the potential to improve the clinical diagnostic process, allowing for the early detection of malignant skin tumors – including melanoma – and a reduction in the number of surgical excisions of benign lesions. Other promising areas of application include the imaging of lesions where excisions are hazardous or impossible and the guidance of surgical interventions through identification of tumor margins.

Dentistry

Researchers in Tokyo medical and Dental University were able to detect enamel white spot lesions around and beneath the orthodontic brackets using swept source OCT.

Research applications 
Researchers have used OCT to produce detailed images of mice brains, through a "window" made of zirconia that has been modified to be transparent and implanted in the skull. Optical coherence tomography is also applicable and increasingly used in industrial applications, such as nondestructive testing (NDT), material thickness measurements, and in particular thin silicon wafers and compound semiconductor wafers thickness measurements surface roughness characterization, surface and cross-section imaging and volume loss measurements. OCT systems with feedback can be used to control manufacturing processes. With high speed data acquisition, and sub-micron resolution, OCT is adaptable to perform both inline and off-line. Due to the high volume of produced pills, an interesting field of application is in the pharmaceutical industry to control the coating of tablets. Fiber-based OCT systems are particularly adaptable to industrial environments. These can access and scan interiors of hard-to-reach spaces, and are able to operate in hostile environments—whether radioactive, cryogenic, or very hot. Novel optical biomedical diagnostic and imaging technologies are currently being developed to solve problems in biology and medicine. As of 2014, attempts have been made to use optical coherence tomography to identify root canals in teeth, specifically canal in the maxillary molar, however, there is no difference with the current methods of dental operatory microscope. Research conducted in 2015 was successful in utilizing a smartphone as an OCT platform, although much work remains to be done before such a platform would be commercially viable. Photonic integrated circuits may be a promising option to miniaturized OCT. Similarly to integrated circuits silicon-based fabrication techniques can be used to produced miniaturized photonic systems. First in vivo human retinal imaging has been reported recently

See also 

 Angle-resolved low-coherence interferometry
 Ballistic photon
 Confocal microscopy
 Interferometry
 Intracoronary optical coherence tomography
 Leica Microsystems
 Medical imaging
 Novacam Technologies
 Optical heterodyne detection
 Optical projection tomography
 Spectroscopic optical coherence tomography
 Terahertz tomography
 Tomography

References 

 
Eye procedures
Laser medicine
Medical equipment
Optical imaging